John J. Fruin is an engineer, urban planner, and author known for his work in the field of crowd science. In 1983, he received the American Society of Civil Engineers Transportation Engineering Award.

Early life and education
His parents were Mr. and Mrs. John Fruin, who lived in Brooklyn, New York. In 1951, he received a B.C.E degree from Manhattan College. He attended Polytechnic Institute of Brooklyn, where he received his M.C.E, M.S., and PhD degrees.

Career
He evaluated personal comfort zones of individuals in different situations, which is affected by national culture, the degree to which people are intimate with one another, mental health, and other factors. He coined the terms "intimate distance", the narrowest zone; "touch zone"; "no touch zone"; and the widest zone, "personal comfort zone". Fruin was a consultant to the investigation into The Who concert disaster of 1979. He also was an adjunct professor at Polytechnic. Now retired, he was formerly employed as a research engineer by the Port Authority of New York and New Jersey. 

For his research on pedestrian traffic, he received the American Society of Civil Engineers Transportation Engineering Award in 1983. He was a member of the Human Factors and Ergonomics Society, a Fellow of the Institute of Transportation Engineers, and a Fellow of the American Society of Civil Engineers.

Personal life
Fruin married fellow Brooklyn resident, Rita Murray, in the spring of 1952. He has lived in Massapequa, New York.

Publications

References

Further reading

 

Year of birth missing (living people)
Living people
Port Authority of New York and New Jersey people
Crowds
Pedestrian infrastructure
People from Massapequa, New York
Fellows of the American Society of Civil Engineers
Manhattan College alumni
Polytechnic Institute of New York University alumni
Polytechnic Institute of New York University faculty